Parliamentary elections were held in Transkei on 24 October 1973. The Transkei National Independence Party  won 25 of the 40 elected seats.

Results

Aftermath
By-elections were held for the two vacant seats in 1974, both of which were won by the Transkei National Independence Party.

References

Transkei
Elections in Transkei
October 1973 events in Africa